The 1906 Olympia Brewery brewhouse, known locally as "the Old Brewery", is located at the base of the Tumwater Falls in Tumwater, Washington.  Once the manufacturing site for Olympia Beer, the classic Mission Revival structure, designed by prominent local architect Joseph Wohleb, replaced the initial wooden plant constructed in 1896. Dedicated in 1906, closed since the advent of Prohibition, this imposing redbrick structure has long served as a landmark for local residents and drivers along Interstate 5. A new brewery was built in 1934, uphill from the original brewhouse. Brewing operations in a modern plant on the site ended in 2003.

The brewery has been for sale since the collapse of a real estate deal with a bottled water company in 2007. After condemning previous owners' water rights in April 2008, the cities of Lacey, Olympia and Tumwater took possession of water rights once held by the former Olympia Brewing Company.

The original brewhouse is part of the Tumwater Historic District, listed on the National Register of Historic Places.

October 2018 fire 
On the early morning of October 8, 2018, the Tumwater Fire Department responded to the Olympia Brewery Complex for a reported structure fire. The fire had fully engulfed the building that formerly housed the Brewery offices. Part of the building collapsed as the crews extinguished the fire. There was no word on the cause of the fire though it is believed to be caused by people cutting copper wires out. The building still had some electrical currents which sparked a flame.

See also
 History of Olympia, Washington

References

External links
Olympia Brewing Company Library Collection, 1937-2007
Friends of the Old Brewery

Industrial buildings completed in 1896
Buildings and structures in Thurston County, Washington
Brewery buildings in the United States
Historic district contributing properties in Washington (state)
National Register of Historic Places in Thurston County, Washington